SS Samuel Johnston was a Liberty ship built in the United States during World War II. She was named after Samuel Johnston, an American planter, lawyer, and statesman from Chowan County, North Carolina. He represented North Carolina in both the Continental Congress and the United States Senate, and was the sixth Governor of North Carolina.

Construction
Samuel Johnston was laid down on 14 April 1942, under a Maritime Commission (MARCOM) contract, MCE hull 46, by the Bethlehem-Fairfield Shipyard, Baltimore, Maryland; she was sponsored by Miss Elaine Trimble, the daughter of Colonel South Trimble Jr., the Solicitor for the Department of Commerce, and was launched on 14 June 1942.

History
She was allocated to Eastern Steamship Co., on 30 June 1942. On 27 September 1947, she was laid up in the National Defense Reserve Fleet, Wilmington, North Carolina. She was sold for scrapping on 24 March 1957, to Union Minerals & Alloys Corp., for $48,770. She was removed from the fleet, 26 April 1967.

References

Bibliography

 
 
 
 

 

Liberty ships
1942 ships
Ships built in Baltimore
Wilmington Reserve Fleet